The fifth season of the drama television series El Señor de los Cielos premiered on Telemundo on June 20, 2017, and concluded on November 2, 2017. The season follows the revenge of Aurelio against his nephew Víctor Casillas and his enemy La Felina.

It stars Rafael Amaya as Aurelio Casillas — A Mexican drug lord, along with Fernanda Castillo, Carmen Aub, Vanessa Villela, Sabrina Seara, and incorporation into the lead role of Maricela González, and Mariana Seoane and Miguel Varoni both including as special participation.

The fifth season of the series was made available on Blim on September 22, 2017.

Plot 
Aurelio Casillas (Rafael Amaya) has retreated from action and business to live his relationship with Emiliana Contreras (Vanessa Villela), his last lover, at a ranch near the mountain known as the Golden Triangle between the states of Sonora, Sinaloa and Durango, apparently enjoying their condition of "dead" for the authorities. However, within his soul and in his cold brain, he prepares because he knows that soon the war that is pending with Víctor (Jorge Luis Moreno), his nephew, will begin soon, and one of the two will not come alive. It will be a war to the death that will shed a great deal of blood and not of other people, but of his own family.

Mónica (Fernanda Castillo) was seriously injured from the day of her wedding and it's been a while since she awoke from the coma that kept her on the verge of death. While Doña Alba (Lisa Owen), she is in danger when attackers destroy the convent where she was long confined and uses her son to save her skin and the nuns who are at risk of rape and death. Víctor, oblivious to everything that has happened to Mónica and the rest of his family, lives crazy for not finding his wife. Rage and bitterness have taken possession of him and he has Mexico plunged into horror and chaos. Los Maras Salvatruchas and other emerging organizations at their command, all ruthless and cruel, have been engaged in dealing with drugs, kidnappings, piracy and trafficking in persons, leading the government to declare itself in emergency. His loyal collaborator, Superjavi (Alejandro López) has decided to withdraw to Colombia and operate from there because he knows that he will not reach a good end if he stays next to Víctor, and seeks the alliance with Aurelio.

Ismael (Iván Arana), meanwhile, has occupied the position of family counselor Casillas and will do everything possible to try to have his family united and above all, to achieve a truce between his father and his cousin. La Felina (Maricela González), who had been detained, warns Emiliana, her ally, that she will be extradited and rescued to make her a part of her cartel, all behind Aurelio. Once in the street, La Felina organizes a group of Colombians to support Emiliana. Mónica, once recovered, joins the business again, setting up her own group, ready to end all past joining with the Casillas to be released from that trap of their own heart. Nevertheless, Aurelio discovers the great lie of Emiliana and Lourdes (Ofelia Medina) and must give the reason to Mónica, who always confronted them, and to look for an alliance with her that will begin by the strategies of its politics of war, but in a very little time will try to take it to their bed, as they both wish, but out of pride they deny.

They will be Aurelio and his new allies, the posters of the old guard, in union with the Colombians, who paradoxically, will save the country from its total destruction, before the impassive look of the authorities. Once peace is attained, with the pain of her own shed blood, she will seek to close with Mónica the story they have unfinished, not knowing if this is possible after so much pain and so much death.

Cast

Main 
 Rafael Amaya as Aurelio Casillas
 Fernanda Castillo as Mónica Robles
 Carmen Aub as Rutila Casillas
 Sabrina Seara as Esperanza Salvatierra
 Vanessa Villela as Emiliana Contreras
 Maricela González  as Eunice “La Felina” Lara
 Mariana Seoane as Mabel Castaño / Ninón del Valle
 Miguel Varoni as Leandro Quezada

Recurring 
 Plutarco Haza as Dalvio “El Ingeniero” Navarrete 
 Wendy de los Cobos as Aguasanta "Tata" Guerra
 Lisa Owen as Alba Casillas
 Patricia Vico as Pilar Ortiz
 Jorge Luis Moreno as Víctor Casillas Jr.
 Iván Arana as Ismael Casillas
 Manuel Balbi as Rodrigo Rivero Lanz
 Jesús Moré as Omar Terán
 Carlos Mata as Juan Carlos Salvatierra
 Lorena del Castillo as Oficial Evelyn García
 Juan Martín Jauregui as Sebastián Almagro
 Ofelia Medina as Lourdes Contreras
 Ernesto Benjumea as Melquiades Soler / Penumbra
 Ricardo Leguizamo as Rafael Jiménez / Doble 30
 Catherina Cardozo as Giuseppina "Pina" Cortini
 José Juan Meraz as David Ponce
 Alex Walerstein as El Greñas
 Alan Slim as Jaime Ernesto Rosales
 Alejandro Félix as Chatarrero
 Francisco Calvillo as Rubén Saba
 Carlos Puente as Pompeyo
 Daniela Zavala as Arelis Mendoza
 José Sedek as Bernardo Castillo
 Polo Monarrez as Filemón
 Paloma Jiménez as Paloma Villareal
 Iván Tamayo as Jorge Elías Salazar
 Alejandro López as El Súper Javi
 Emmanuel Esparza as Tony Pastrana
 Rafael Novoa as Raymundo Cabrera / El Duro
 Leonardo Álvarez as Leonardo Castaño /  El Chema II
 Elsy Reyes as Carla Uzcátegui
 Carlos Gallardo as Carlos Zuleta

Special guest stars 
 Roberto Tapia as himself
 Juan Manuel Mendoza as Andrés Velandia
 Karla Carrillo as Corina Saldaña
 Daniel Rascón as El Toro
 Robinson Díaz as Miltón Jiménez / El Cabo

Production 
During a radio interview with Javier Poza, Fernanda Castillo confirmed that the series would have a fifth season. In a press renewal series release for the 2017-2018 television season, NBCUniversal Telemundo Enterprises announced that the series would be renewed for a fifth and sixth season. On May 8, 2017, it was confirmed that the production for the fifth season had begun in Mexico City. On May 25, 2017,  Telemundo confirmed the main plot of the season in an advance that went on the air. On June 8, 2017, Telemundo published an exclusive preview of the series through its website.

Casting 
The new season has the previous cast of the previous seasons, also introduced new characters as Mariana Seoane as Mabel Castaño, character that appeared previously in the series El Chema. It also has the integration of actors Rafael Novoa and Emmanuel Esparza. As do the Venezuelan actors, Carlos Mata as Juan Carlos Salvatierra and Catherina Cardozo as Giuseppina.

Reception 
In its premiere the average series a total of 2.27 million spectators, surpassing thus to La Piloto, series of Univision and with that towards competition in its final chapters. After that the series became the most viewed season of the series, forcing Univision to change its programming in the schedule of the 10pm/9c several times.

Episodes

References 

El Señor de los Cielos
2017 American television seasons
2017 Mexican television seasons